Dan Shingles (born 5 July 1986) is an English field hockey player who plays as a midfielder for Old Georgians. He represented the England and Great Britain national teams from 2012 to 2016.

Club career

Shingles plays club hockey in the Men's England Hockey League Premier Division for Old Georgians.
He has also played for Reading & Southgate.

References

Living people
1986 births
Sportspeople from London
English male field hockey players
Southgate Hockey Club players
Reading Hockey Club players
Men's England Hockey League players
2014 Men's Hockey World Cup players